Schefflenz is a town in the district of Neckar-Odenwald-Kreis, in Baden-Württemberg, Germany.

References

Neckar-Odenwald-Kreis